The Jungang Expressway is an expressway in South Korea.  Its name literally means "Central Expressway," and for much of its length it runs through mountainous terrain near the country's east-west center line, including the national parks of Chiaksan and Sobaeksan. It covers a total distance of roughly 388.1 kilometers.

The southern end is in Sasang-gu, Busan, although for much of the distance between Busan and Daegu it runs together with the Gyeongbu Expressway. Its northern end is in Chuncheon, Gangwon Province.  The expressway was completed in December 2001.

There is also a short branch named Jungang Expressway Branch near the southern end. This is numbered 551.

Chuncheon ~ Cheorwon section (63.0 km) is on the drawing boards.

History 

 September 20, 1989 : Under Construction (Chuncheon ~ Daegu)
 December 15, 1994 : Geumho JCT ~ Chilgok (6.1 km), S.Wonju ~ Manjong JCT (6.2 km) section opened the traffic. (2 Lanes)
 August 29, 1995 : Chilgok ~ W.Andong (79.8 km), S.Jecheon ~ S.Wonju (30.1 km), Hongcheon~Chuncheon (25.2 km) Section opened the traffic. (2 Lanes)
 July 1, 1999 : Gangseo Nakdongganggyo (br) (강서낙동강교, 1.6 km) opened the traffic.
 September 16, 1999 : W.Andong ~ Yeongju section opened the traffic.
 June 1, 2000 : Chilgok ~ W.Andong, Yeongju ~ Punggi (9.5 km), Jecheon ~ S.Wonju (37.6 km), Hongcheon ~ Chuncheon (26.2 km) opened the traffic. (4 Lanes)
 February 12, 2001 : construction began on the Daegu-Busan Expressway segment
 August 17, 2001 : Manjong JCT ~ Hongcheon (42.5 km) opened the traffic.
 December 14, 2001 : Punggi ~ Jecheon (51.2 km) opened the traffic.
 January 2005 : East Daegu Junction ~ East Daegu IC Section opened the traffic.
 January 15, 2006 : East Daegu JCT ~ Daedong JCT (Daegu-Busan Expressway) section opened the traffic.

Information

Lanes 
 Samnak IC ~ Chojeong IC, Daedong JC ~ E.Daegu JC, Geumho JC ~ Chuncheon IC : 4 Lanes
 Chojeong IC ~ Daedong JC : 6 Lanes
 E.Daegu JC ~ Geumho JC : 8 Lanes

Lengths 
 Total: 388.10 km

Speed limit 
 Samnak IC ~ Daedong JC, E.Daegu JC ~ Chuncheon IC : 100 km/h
 Daedong IC ~ E.Daegu JC: 110 km/h

Daegu–Busan Expressway

The Daegu–Busan Expressway is a segment of the Jungang Expressway which runs north from Daegu to Busan. Officially, it is part of the Jungang Expressway, but some maps use this name for this section. The estimated travel time between the two cities is roughly 1 hour, saving about half an hour over the previous travel time on the Gyeongbu Expressway.  The toll for a passenger car is 8,500 won, slightly less than the cost of a KTX ticket between the two cities.

Construction was completed in February 2006, at a total cost of slightly over 1 trillion won.  The project was overseen by Hyundai Development Company, also known as I-Park, which has promoted the project under the name "I-Way."  It was heavily supported by loans from the Korean Road Infrastructure Fund operated by Australia's Macquarie Bank.  The term of the financing is 30 years.

It has 4 lanes over a length of 82.05 km with a speed limit of 100 km/h.

List of facilities 

 IC: Interchange, JC: Junction, SA: Service Area, TG:Tollgate
 Blue Section (■): reiteration section of Gyeongbu Expressway
 (■): Daegu-Busan Expressway

See also 
 Roads and expressways in South Korea
 Transportation in South Korea

See also
Roads and expressways in South Korea
Transportation in South Korea
Jungang Line (railroad)

References

External links
 MOLIT South Korean Government Transport Department
Expressway profile in Korean
Macquarie Bank profile of the project

 
Expressways in South Korea
Transport in Busan
South Gyeongsang Province
Daegu
North Gyeongsang Province
Gangwon Province, South Korea
Roads in Busan
Roads in South Gyeongsang
Roads in North Gyeongsang
Roads in Daegu
Roads in North Chungcheong
Roads in Gangwon